67 (pronounced six-seven) are a British hip hop collective originally composed of rappers LD, Monkey, Dimzy, Liquez, ASAP and 67 Sj. The group has expanded since its inception, with many new members joining. They are best known for their 2016 track "Lets Lurk", and are widely regarded as highly influential on the UK drill scene.
They were nominated for Best Newcomer at the 2016 MOBO Awards.

The group has been labelled a "criminal gang" by the police, and has had several shows shut down, including their first UK tour after it sold out due to the controversial Form 696.

History
67 formed in Brixton Hill, South London, and rose to fame in 2014. They are known as one of the early adopters of the UK drill sound, with them being the first group to gain more mainstream popularity. They are best known for their 2016 track "Lets Lurk" featuring Giggs, whose instrumental was used by Big Shaq in his 2017 parody track "Man's Not Hot". They saw chart success again in 2017, when the single "Glorious Twelfth" peaked at 77 on the official charts.

Members 
The list below includes confirmed members of 67.

Current members
 AK
 ASAP (Malki Martin)
 Dimzy (Steven Mubama)
 Doggy
 dopesmoke
 G.Y (also known as Graveyard)
 LD (Cassiel Wuta-Ofei; or Scribz)
 Liquez (Melique Garraway)
 Monkey (Lloyd Acheampong)
 R6 (Richard Ofwemi)
 Silent
 67 Sj (Joshua Amon)
 ST (Siratillah Ford)
 PR SAD (or simply PR)
 Y.SJ
BruckSav (or Brucka)

Former members
 Itch / Maddix (Chris Kaba; died from a gunshot wound after a Metropolitan Police officer shot him)
 Smallz

Legal issues

Ban from music
In 2014, Scribz was issued an ASBO that banned him from making and performing music for two years. Following this, Scribz began wearing a mask to conceal his identity and took on the alias LD, with his first song as LD being "Live Corn". After his ASBO came to an end in 2016, he released "Wicked and Bad" as Scribz in which he sent for opposing gangs and revealed that he was LD. In 2017, he was jailed for possession of a knife. The group has been labelled a "criminal gang" by the police, and had their first UK tour shut down. In July 2018, Dimzy shared an open letter accusing the police and media of "scapegoating" their music.

Drug trafficking
In 2018, 67 was identified as running five county lines to neighbouring counties; 16 affiliates of the group were arrested in July 2019 and sentenced to a total of 61 years. In 2019, LD (Scribz) and ASAP were jailed for 4.5 years each for their involvement in county lines drug dealing; LD was released in November 2021.

Controversy

Shooting of Chris Kaba 

On 5 September 2022, Chris Kaba, a 24-year-old member and rapper of 67 who was known by his stage-name Itch, Mad Itch or Madix, was shot dead by police in Streatham Hill. Kaba, who had previously been  imprisoned for possessing an imitation firearm with intent to cause fear of violence, was driving an Audi Q8, not registered to him, which was followed by an unmarked police car occupied by armed officers. Police vehicles boxed the car in, but Kaba ignored repeated orders to get out of the vehicle, and was trying to ram the Audi through the roadblock when, according to the IOPC, police fired a single round, striking him. He was taken to a nearby hospital, where he died of his injuries just after 12:00 am the following day. According to the IOPC, the Audi was linked to a "firearms incident" a few days before through automatic number-plate recognition, and "no non-police firearms were found" either in the car or at the scene. Kaba's family called for a homicide investigation into his death and for information about whether any weapons were found. 

Members of his family said that he would not have been shot dead if he were not black. Kaba's cousin Jefferson Bosela, said "I've put it out there he wasn't perfect… but regardless of that nobody deserves to be killed by the police unless there is an imminent or direct threat to the public." Charity group Inquest released a statement which read "dad-to-be Chris’ loved ones said they are worried his life was cut short due to his skin colour." In response to the shooting, a small crowd of about 40 protestors gathered outside Brixton police station on 8 September 2022, demanding justice for Kaba's death. Further protests took place outside New Scotland Yard in which over 300 people, including former Leader of the Opposition Jeremy Corbyn, attended. Sarah-Jane Mee mistook the protest for the gathering of people marking the death of the Queen; Sky News later issued an apology regarding this.

On 21 September the family of the deceased viewed the police body-worn camera footage of the incident. Having seen it, Bosela said that they would be taking a step back in their protest about the death.

Awards and nominations
Nominated for Best Newcomer at the 2016 MOBO Awards.

Discography

Mixtapes
 Dimzy - A Glass of Water (2013)
 LD, Monkey, Dimzy - 6.7 (2015)
 In Skengs We Trust (2015)
 Lets Lurk (2016)
 Glorious Twelfth (2017)
 The 6 (2018)
 Dimzy - Dim The Lights (2018)
 Monkey -Wild N Loose (2019)
 R6 & ST - Search & Destroy (2018)
 Quarantined (2020)
 Liquez - Released Under Investigation (2020)
 Dimzy - A Glass of Water 2 (2021)
 dopesmoke & Silent - Hillside (2021)

EPs
Dimzy and Swift - Smoke and Water (2022)

References

English hip hop groups
Musical groups from the London Borough of Lambeth
Rappers from London
Musical groups established in 2014
2014 establishments in England
UK drill musicians